Donald Eugene Cherry (November 18, 1936 – October 19, 1995) was an American jazz trumpeter. Beginning in the late 1950s, Cherry had a long tenure performing in the bands of saxophonist Ornette Coleman, as on the pioneering free jazz albums The Shape of Jazz to Come (1959) and Free Jazz: A Collective Improvisation (1960). He also collaborated separately with musicians such as John Coltrane, Charlie Haden, Sun Ra, Ed Blackwell, the New York Contemporary Five, and Albert Ayler.

Cherry released his debut album as bandleader, Complete Communion, in 1966. In the 1970s, he became a pioneer in world fusion music, drawing on traditional African, Middle Eastern, and Hindustani music. He was a member of the ECM group Codona, along with percussionist Naná Vasconcelos and sitar and tabla player Collin Walcott. AllMusic called him "one of the most influential jazz musicians of the late 20th century."

Early life
Cherry was born in Oklahoma City, Oklahoma, to a mother of Choctaw descent and an African-American father. His mother and grandmother played piano and his father played trumpet. His father owned Oklahoma City's Cherry Blossom Club, which hosted performances by Charlie Christian and Fletcher Henderson. In 1940, Cherry moved with his family to Los Angeles, California. He lived in the Watts neighborhood, and his father tended bar at the Plantation Club on Central Avenue, which at the time was the center of a vibrant jazz scene. Cherry recalled skipping school at Fremont High School in order to play with the swing band at Jefferson High School. This resulted in his transfer to Jacob Riis High School, a reform school, where he first met drummer Billy Higgins.

Career
By the early 1950s Cherry was playing with jazz musicians in Los Angeles, sometimes acting as pianist in Art Farmer's group. While trumpeter Clifford Brown was in Los Angeles with Max Roach, Cherry attended a jam session with Brown and Larance Marable at Eric Dolphy's house, and Brown informally mentored Cherry. He also toured with saxophonist James Clay.

Cherry became well known in 1958 when he performed and recorded with Ornette Coleman, first in a quintet with pianist Paul Bley and later in what became the predominantly piano-less quartet which recorded for Atlantic Records. During this period, "his lines ... gathered much of their freedom of motion from the free harmonic structures." Cherry co-led The Avant-Garde session which saw John Coltrane replacing Coleman in the Quartet, recorded and toured with Sonny Rollins, was a member of the New York Contemporary Five with Archie Shepp and John Tchicai, and recorded and toured with both Albert Ayler and George Russell. His first recording as a leader was Complete Communion for Blue Note Records in 1965. The band included Coleman's drummer Ed Blackwell as well as saxophonist Gato Barbieri, whom he had met while touring Europe with Ayler, and bassist Henry Grimes.

After a departure from Coleman's quartet, Cherry often played in small groups and duets (many with ex-Coleman drummer Ed Blackwell) during a long sojourn in Scandinavia and other locations. He traveled through Europe, India, Morocco, South Africa, and elsewhere to explore and play with a variety of musicians. In the late 1960s he settled in Tagarp, Sweden with his wife, Swedish designer and textile artist Moki Cherry. In 1968, Don Cherry taught music classes with guest lecturers, performance collaborators, and workshop leaders from around the world at Arbetarnas bildningsförbund (ABF) House, a Swedish labor movement-run education center. For ten years, Don and Moki Cherry lived and worked collaboratively in an abandoned schoolhouse in Tagarp, holding classes and performances, hosting guests and collaborators, and exploring their concept of Organic Music Society.

In 1969, Cherry played trumpet and other instruments for beat poet Allen Ginsberg's 1970 LP Songs of Innocence and Experience, a musical adaptation of William Blake's poetry collection of the same name. He appeared on Coleman's 1971 LP Science Fiction, and from 1976 to 1987 reunited with Coleman alumni Dewey Redman, Charlie Haden, and Blackwell in the band Old And New Dreams, recording four albums with them, two for ECM and two for Black Saint, where his "subtlety of rhythmic expansion and contraction" was noted.

In the 1970s he ventured into the developing genre of world fusion music. Cherry incorporated influences of Middle Eastern, traditional African, and Indian music into his playing. He studied Indian music with Vasant Rai in the early seventies. From 1978 to 1982, he recorded three albums for ECM with "world jazz" group Codona, consisting of Cherry, percussionist Naná Vasconcelos and sitar and tabla player Collin Walcott.

Cherry also collaborated with classical composer Krzysztof Penderecki on the 1971 album Actions. In 1973, he co-composed the score for Alejandro Jodorowsky's film The Holy Mountain, together with Ronald Frangipane and Jodorowsky.

At the end of the 70s, the trio Organic Music Theater (with Gian Piero Pramaggiore and Naná Vasconcelos), had an intense live activity in Italy and France.

During the 1980s, he released the recording El Corazon, a 1982 duet album with Ed Blackwell. He also made two albums as bandleader, Home Boy (Sister Out) in 1985 and Art Deco in 1988. Cherry recorded again with the original Ornette Coleman Quartet on Coleman's 1987 album In All Languages,

Other playing opportunities in his career came with Carla Bley's Escalator Over The Hill project, and as a sideman on recordings by Lou Reed, Ian Dury, Rip Rig + Panic and Sun Ra.

In 1994, Cherry appeared on the Red Hot Organization's compilation CD, Stolen Moments: Red Hot + Cool, on a track titled "Apprehension", alongside The Watts Prophets. The album, meant to raise awareness of the AIDS epidemic in African-American society, was named "Album of the Year" by Time magazine.

Death and legacy

Cherry died on October 19, 1995, at the age of 58 from liver cancer in Málaga, Spain.

Cherry was inducted into the Oklahoma Jazz Hall of Fame in 2011.

Family
He was married to Monika Karlsson (Moki Cherry), a Swedish painter and textile artist, who also occasionally played tamboura drone on his recordings and jams. His stepdaughter, Neneh Cherry, his step-granddaughters Mabel and Tyson and his sons, David Ornette Cherry, Christian Cherry, and Eagle-Eye Cherry, are also musicians. David Ornette Cherry died from an asthma attack at the age of 64 on November 20, 2022.

Instruments
Cherry learned to play various brass instruments in high school. Throughout his career, Cherry played pocket cornet (though Cherry identified this as a pocket trumpet), trumpet, cornet, flugelhorn, and bugle.

Cherry began his career as a pianist, and would continue playing piano and organ.

After returning from a musical and cultural journey through Africa, Cherry often played the donso ngoni, a harp-lute with a gourd body originating from West Africa (see ngoni). During his international journeys, he also collected a variety of non-Western instruments, which he mastered and often played in performances and on recordings. Among these instruments were berimbau, bamboo flutes and assorted percussion instruments.

Technique and style
Cherry's trumpet influences included Miles Davis, Fats Navarro, Clifford Brown, and Harry Edison. Journalist Howard Mandel suggests Henry "Red" Allen as a precedent (given Allen's "blustery rather than Armstrong-brazen brass sound, jauntily unpredictable melodic streams, squeezed-off and/or half-valve effects and repertoire including novelty vocals") while Ekkehard Jost cites Wild Bill Davison.

Some critics have noted shortcomings in Cherry's technique. Ron Wynn writes that "[Cherry's] technique isn't always the most efficient; frequently, his rapid-fired solos contain numerous missed or muffed notes. But he's a master at exploring the trumpet and cornet's expressive, voice-like properties; he bends notes and adds slurs and smears, and his twisting solos are tightly constructed and executed regardless of their flaws." Jost notes the tendency for writers to focus on Cherry's "technical insecurity", but asserts that "the problem lies elsewhere. Perfect technical control in extremely fast tempos was more or less risk-free as long as the improviser had to deal with standard changes that were familiar to him from years of working with them.... In the music of the Ornette Coleman Quartet—a 'new-found-land' where the laws and habits of functional harmony do not apply—there is no use for patterns that had been worked out on that basis."

Miles Davis was initially dismissive of Cherry's playing, claiming that "anyone can tell that guy's not a trumpet player—it's just notes that come out, and every note he plays he looks serious about, and people will go for that, especially white people." According to Cherry, however, when Davis attended an Ornette Coleman performance at the Five Spot, he was impressed with Cherry's playing and sat in with the group using Cherry's pocket trumpet. Later, in a 1964 DownBeat blindfold test, Davis indicated that he liked Cherry's playing.

Discography

As leader or co-leader

With Old and New Dreams
 Old and New Dreams (Black Saint, 1976)
 Old and New Dreams (ECM, 1979)
 Playing (ECM, 1980)
 A Tribute to Blackwell (Black Saint, 1987)

With Codona
Codona (ECM, 1979)
Codona 2 (ECM, 1981)
Codona 3 (ECM, 1983)

As sideman
With Ornette Coleman
 Something Else!!!! (Contemporary, 1958)
 Tomorrow Is the Question! (Contemporary, 1959)
 The Shape of Jazz to Come (Atlantic, 1959)
 Change of the Century (Atlantic, 1960)
 Twins (Atlantic, 1959–60 [1971])
 The Art of the Improvisers (Atlantic, 1959–61 [1970])
 To Whom Who Keeps a Record (Atlantic, 1959–60 [1975])
 This is our Music (Atlantic, 1960)
 Free Jazz: A Collective Improvisation (Atlantic, 1960)
 Ornette! (Atlantic, 1961)
 Ornette on Tenor (Atlantic, 1961)
 Crisis (Impulse!, 1969)
 Science Fiction (Columbia, 1971)
 Broken Shadows (Columbia, 1971 [1982])
 In All Languages (Caravan of Dreams, 1987)

With the New York Contemporary Five
 Consequences (Fontana, 1963)
 New York Contemporary Five Vol. 1 (Sonet, 1963)
 New York Contemporary Five Vol. 2 (Sonet, 1963)
 Bill Dixon 7-tette/Archie Shepp and the New York Contemporary Five (Savoy, 1964)

With Albert Ayler
 Ghosts (Debut, 1964)
 The Hilversum Session (Osmosis, 1964)
 New York Eye and Ear Control (ESP, 1965)
 The Copenhagen Tapes (Ayler, 2002)

With Carla Bley
 Escalator over the Hill (JCOA, 1971)

With Paul Bley
Live at the Hilcrest Club 1958 (Inner City, 1958 [1976])
Coleman Classics Volume 1 (Improvising Artists, 1958 [1977])

With Bongwater 
Double Bummer (Shimmy-Disc [1988])

With Charles Brackeen
Rhythm X (Strata-East, 1973)

With Allen Ginsberg
Songs of Innocence and Experience (MGM, 1970)

With Charlie Haden
Liberation Music Orchestra (Impulse!, 1969)
 The Golden Number (1976) (one track)
The Ballad of the Fallen (ECM, 1986)
The Montreal Tapes: with Don Cherry and Ed Blackwell (Verve, 1989 [1994])

With Abdullah Ibrahim
The Journey (Chiaroscuro, 1977)

With Clifford Jordan
In the World (Strata-East, 1969 [1972])

With Steve Lacy
Evidence (New Jazz, 1962)

With Michael Mantler
 The Jazz Composer's Orchestra (ECM, 1968)
 No Answer (WATT/ECM 1973)

With Sunny Murray
 Sonny's Time Now (Jihad, 1965)

With Jim Pepper
 Comin' and Goin' (Europa, 1983)

With Sonny Rollins
 Our Man in Jazz (RCA Victor, 1962)

With George Russell
George Russell Sextet at Beethoven Hall (MPS, 1965)

With Sun Ra
 Hiroshima (1983)
 Stars That Shine Darkly (1983)
 Purple Night (A&M, 1990)
 Somewhere Else (Rounder, 1993)

With Lou Reed
 The Bells (Arista, 1979)
With Charlie Rouse
Epistrophy (Landmark, 1989)
With others
 Albert Heath and James Mtume along with Herbie Hancock and Ed Blackwell – Kawaida (1969
 Alejandro Jodorowsky- The Holy Mountain Soundtrack (1973)
 Terry Riley – Terry Riley and Don Cherry Duo (B.Free, 1975)
 Steve Hillage – L (1976)
 Collin Walcott – Grazing Dreams (ECM, 1977)
 Latif Khan – Music/Sangam (1978)
 Johnny Dyani – Song for Biko (1978)
 Masahiko Togashi - Session In Paris, Vol. 1 "Song Of Soil" (Take One/King, 1979)
 Bengt Berger – Bitter Funeral Beer (ECM, 1981)
 Rip Rig + Panic – I Am Cold (1982)
 Bengt Berger Bitter Funeral Beer Band – Live in Frankfurt (1982)
 Dag Vag – Almanacka (1983)
 Frank Lowe – Decision in Paradise (Soul Note, 1984)
 Jai Uttal – Footprints (1990)
 Ed Blackwell Project – What It Be Like? Ed Blackwell Project Vol. 2 (1992) (one track)

References

External links

The Slits' memoirs of Don Cherry
Discography at eagle-eye-cherry.com
Discography
Don Cherry biography (in German and English) and bibliography (in English)

1936 births
1995 deaths
American jazz trumpeters
American male trumpeters
American expatriates in Spain
African-American jazz musicians
Avant-garde jazz trumpeters
Modal jazz trumpeters
Post-bop trumpeters
Free jazz trumpeters
Jazz musicians from California
Musicians from Los Angeles
Musicians from Oklahoma City
Antilles Records artists
A&M Records artists
Atlantic Records artists
Chiaroscuro Records artists
BYG Actuel artists
Blue Note Records artists
ECM Records artists
Deaths from liver cancer
Deaths from hepatitis
Deaths from cancer in Spain
Pupils of Pran Nath (musician)
Pupils of La Monte Young
20th-century American musicians
20th-century trumpeters
Jazz musicians from Oklahoma
20th-century American male musicians
American male jazz musicians
John C. Fremont High School alumni
Codona members
The Leaders members
New York Contemporary Five members
Old and New Dreams members
Varèse Sarabande Records artists
Intakt Records artists
Jefferson High School (Los Angeles) alumni
American people of Choctaw descent
Sonet Records artists
20th-century African-American musicians
Spiritual jazz musicians